Pat Cramer and Mike Estep were the defending champions, but Cramer did not participate this year.  Estep partnered Russell Simpson, losing in the second round.

Brian Gottfried and Raúl Ramírez won the title, defeating Dick Stockton and Erik van Dillen 3–6, 6–3, 7–6(7–4) in the final.

Seeds

Draw

Finals

Top half

Section 1

Section 2

Bottom half

Section 3

Section 4

External links
 Draw

U.S. Pro Indoor